Colonel Brijpal Singh was an officer of Indian Army who served with the Rajput Regiment. He was awarded Vir Chakra for his bravery in Indo-Pakistani War of 1947–1948.

Personal life 
He was Tanwar Rajput with roots in Bapora village in Bhiwani district of Haryana. He was born to Rao Bahadur Lieutenant Thakur Sukhpal Singh who, was a recipient of Indian Distinguished Service Medal and administrator at erstwhile Bhajji State. His grandfather Sardar Bahadur Captain Umda Singh was a Member of Royal Victorian Order and Aide-de-camp to King of United Kingdom Edward VII during his time.  Later, he remained Honorary Magistrate of Tehsil Bhiwani.

Military career 
He was commissioned into 1st Battalion The Rajput Regiment.

Vir Chakra Citation

References

Recipients of the Vir Chakra